Moscow Motorcycle Plant (MMZ) was a motorcycle manufacturer, based in Moscow, Russian SFSR.

History
Moscow Motorcycle Plant commenced operations in 1941 building the M-72, a Soviet licensed copy of the BMW R71. With the German invasion of the Soviet Union, the plant was transferred east to the town of Irbit in the Ural region. The new plant was  known as Irbit Motorcycle Factory.

In 1946, the Moscow plant was re-established to manufacture the M-1A Moskva, (the DKW RT 125 taken as war reparations). In 1951 the plant was relocated to Minsk, Byelorussia, and renamed Minsk Motovelo Zavod (Минский Мотовелозавод).

References 
"Entsiklopediya Mototsiklov. Firmi. Modeli. Konstruktsii.", Za Rulem, Moscow (2003). p. 339   Энциклопедия Мотоциклов. Фирмы. Модели. Конструкции. - За Рулем - Москва (2003)

Defunct motorcycle manufacturers of Russia
Motorcycle manufacturers of the Soviet Union
Vehicle manufacturing companies established in 1941
1941 establishments in the Soviet Union
Manufacturing companies based in Moscow